Fels  v  Knowles  [1906] NZGazLawRp 66; (1906) 26 NZLR 604; (1906) 8 GLR 627 is a cited case in New Zealand land law.

References

Property law of New Zealand